State Line Road is a major north–south street in the Kansas City Metropolitan Area that runs along the Kansas–Missouri state line. It runs 12.5 miles (20 km) from Chester Avenue in the north, crossing  Shawnee Mission Parkway a couple of miles from the northern end and continuing south to the intersection of 135th St. in Kansas, Missouri Route 150 in the South.  It continues north as Eaton St. and continues south as Kenneth Rd., both in Kansas.  Its northernmost point is roughly 3/4 mile (1.25 km) south of Interstate 35.  It is the dividing line between Kansas and Missouri for most of the Kansas City metro area south of the confluence of the Kansas and Missouri rivers.  Most of the road runs between Johnson County, Kansas and Kansas City Missouri. Cities along the road include Kansas City, Missouri, Kansas City, Kansas, and several other cities in Johnson County such as Leawood, Mission Hills, Prairie Village, and Westwood Hills.

For northern portions of the road, the Missouri–Kansas state line bisects the roadway. Consequently, for these portions of the road, northbound traffic is in Missouri while southbound traffic is in Kansas. For southern portions of the road, the entire road is in Kansas.

State Line Road is home to 
the home and freighting office of Alexander Majors, a building on the National Register of Historic Places and located at 8145 State Line Road.
several schools on the Missouri side, such as The Barstow School, Pembroke Hill and Rockhurst High School
 Ward Parkway Center at 8600 Ward Parkway

In 2001 Leawood promoted State Line Road as "The State Line Link."

References

Transportation in the Kansas City metropolitan area
Streets in Kansas City, Missouri